Hideo Mabuchi (born 1971) is a physicist and Professor of Applied Physics at Stanford University, and the head of the Mabuchi Lab.

He graduated from Princeton University magna cum laude, with an A.B. in Physics in 1992, and from
California Institute of Technology (Caltech) with a Ph.D. in Physics, in 1998, where he studied with H. Jeff Kimble.

He was a professor at Caltech from 1998 to 2007 (Assistant Professor of Physics, 1998–2001; Associate Professor of Physics and Control & Dynamical Systems, 2001–2007). Since 2007, he has been a Professor of Applied Physics at Stanford.

Awards
 1999 TR100 Young Innovator
 1999–2001 Sloan Research Fellowship
 2000–2002 ONR Young Investigator
 2000 MacArthur Fellow

Works
"Quantum feedback and the quantum-classical transition", Science and ultimate reality: quantum theory, cosmology, and complexity, Editors John D. Barrow, P. C. W. Davies, Charles L. Harper, Cambridge University Press, 2004, 
Measurement and the quantum-classical transition, Metanexus Institute: 2002.

References

1971 births
Princeton University alumni
Stanford University Department of Applied Physics faculty
California Institute of Technology alumni
MacArthur Fellows
Living people